Big Moon Ritual is the debut studio album by American blues rock band Chris Robinson Brotherhood. It was released on June 5, 2012, and was recorded during the same sessions as the band's second album, The Magic Door, which would be released three months later.

Track listing
All songs by Chris Robinson, except where noted.

"Rosalee", "Star or Stone", "Tomorrow Blues" and "Reflections on a Broken Mirror" published by Psychedelic Hippopotamus (BMI). "Tulsa Yesterday", "Beware, Oh Take Care" and "One Hundred Days of Rain" published by Psychedelic Hippopotamus (BMI)/Grand Island Music (ASCAP).

Personnel
Chris Robinson Brotherhood
Chris Robinson – lead vocals, guitar
Neal Casal – guitar, vocals
Adam MacDougall – keyboards, vocals
Mark Dutton – bass, vocals
George Sluppick – drums

Others
Thom Monahan – engineer, mixing, production
Nicolas Essig – assistant
Geoff Neal – assistant
Bruno Borges – artwork
Alan Forbes – artwork (CRB lettering/label art)

References

External links

2012 debut albums
Chris Robinson Brotherhood albums
Albums produced by Thom Monahan